is a Japanese ice hockey player. He competed in the men's tournament at the 1980 Winter Olympics.

References

1954 births
Living people
Japanese ice hockey players
Olympic ice hockey players of Japan
Ice hockey players at the 1980 Winter Olympics
Sportspeople from Hokkaido